The German torpedo boat T6 was one of a dozen Type 35 torpedo boats built for the Kriegsmarine (German Navy) during the late 1930s. Completed in 1940, she initially escorted ships through the Skaggerak before she was assigned to escort minelayers as they laid their minefields in the North Sea and English Channel in July. T6 started laying her own minefields two months later and was flagship of the 2nd Torpedo Boat Flotilla when she struck a mine and sank when attempting to attack several convoys off the Scottish coast in November.

Design and description
The Type 35 was an unsuccessful attempt by the Kriegsmarine to design a fast, ocean-going torpedo boat that did not exceed the  displacement limit of the London Naval Treaty for ships that counted against the national tonnage limit. Their crew numbered 119 officers and sailors.

As built, the Type 35 class mounted a single  SK C/32 gun on the stern. Anti-aircraft defense was provided by a single  SK C/30 anti-aircraft gun superfiring over the 10.5 cm gun and a pair of  C/30 guns on the bridge wings. They carried six above-water  torpedo tubes in two triple mounts and could also carry 30 mines (or 60 if the weather was good). Many boats exchanged the 3.7 cm gun for another 2 cm gun, depth charges and minesweeping paravanes before completion. Late-war additions were limited to the installation of radar, radar detectors and additional AA guns, usually at the expense of the aft torpedo tube mount.

Construction and career
T6 was ordered on 15 January 1936 from DeSchiMAG, laid down at their Bremen shipyard on 3 January 1937 as yard number 935, launched on 16 December 1937 and commissioned on 30 April 1940. The boat was working up until July when she was transferred to the Skaggerak for convoy escort duties. The flotilla escorted a minelaying mission in the English Channel on 5–6 September and then laid minefields itself on 8–9 and 15–16 September in the Straits of Dover. By November the 1st and 2nd Torpedo Boat Flotillas had transferred to Stavanger, Norway. German aerial reconnaissance had located two coastal convoys in early November that the Kriegsmarine estimated would pass Kinnaird Head, Scotland, during the early morning of 7 November. Both flotillas with T6, T7, T8 and their sisters,  and  sailed on 6 November in an attempt to pass through a gap in the British minefields and intercept the convoys around 02:00 the following morning. The British had extended their minefields further north unbeknownst to the Germans and T6, flagship of the 2nd Torpedo Boat Flotilla, struck a mine shortly after midnight. The explosion knocked out both turbines, started a fire aft and gave the ship a 10 degree list. When the forward turbine room started to flood and the list increased, the captain gave the order to abandon ship. T7 and T8 rescued the survivors, but 48 men were lost and the operation was abandoned.

Notes

References

External links
Type 35 on German Navy.de

Type 35 torpedo boats
1937 ships